Talkartoons is a series of 42 animated cartoons produced by Fleischer Studios and distributed by Paramount Pictures between 1929 and 1932.

History
For the Fleischer brothers, the transition to sound was relatively easy.  With the new contract with Paramount Pictures, and without the burden of Red Seal Pictures and Alfred Weiss, Max Fleischer was free to experiment with new, bold ideas.  First he changed the name of the Ko-Ko Song Cartunes series to Screen Songs.  Although the Screen Songs were successful, Fleischer felt that it wasn't enough; Walt Disney also seemed to gain a great amount of fame through his sound cartoons as well. He decided to work with his brother, Dave on a new series of cartoons where the characters did more than just simply dance to the music of the "bouncing ball".  The name for the new series was to be Talkartoons.  When the idea was pitched to Paramount, they leaped at the opportunity.

The Talkartoons started out as one-shot cartoons.  The first entry in the series was Noah's Lark, released on October 26, 1929.  Although a Fleischer cartoon, it appeared to be patterned after the Aesop's Film Fables of Paul Terry.  In it, a Farmer Al Falfa-esque Noah allows the animals of his ark to visit Luna Park.  When he brings them back into the ship, the weight is so heavy that it sinks.  In the end, Noah chases topless mermaids throughout the ocean waters.  Lark has very few gray tones, due to employing the paper-cutout animation process utilized in the Screen Songs produced during the same time and the earlier Fleischer silent works.  It also included copyright-free songs, mostly utilized from old 78-rpm's.

The series began to take a new direction, however, with the arrival of Max and Dave's brother, Lou Fleischer, whose skills in music and mathematics made a great impact at the studio.  A dog named Bimbo gradually became the featured character of the series.  The first cartoon that featured Bimbo was Hot Dog (1930), the first Fleischer cartoon to be animated on cels, and thus to employ a full range of greys.  New animators such as Grim Natwick, Shamus Culhane, and Rudy Zamora began entering the Fleischer Studio, with new ideas that pushed the Talkartoons into a league of their own.  Natwick especially had an off-beat style of animating that helped give the shorts more of a surreal quality.  Perhaps his greatest contribution to the Talkartoons series and the Fleischer Studio was the creation of Betty Boop with Dizzy Dishes in 1930.

By late 1931, Betty Boop dominated the series. Koko the Clown was brought out of retirement from the silent days as a third character to Betty and Bimbo.  By 1932, the series was at an inevitable end and instead, Betty Boop would be given her own series, with Bimbo and Koko as secondary characters.

Filmography
Dave Fleischer was the credited director on every cartoon produced by Fleischer Studios. Fleischer's actual duties were those of a film producer and creative supervisor, with the head animators doing much of the work assigned to animation directors in other studios. The head animator is the first animator listed. Credited animators are therefore listed for each short. Note that many of the shorts from 1931-32 don't have their animator credits listed, as they were cut when the shorts were sold to television and had their titles replaced.

See also
 Betty Boop
 Fleischer Studios
 The Golden Age of American animation

References
Sources
 Leslie Cabarga, The Fleischer Story (Da Capo Press, 1988)
 Richard Fleischer, Out of the Inkwell: Max Fleischer and the Animation Revolution (University Press of Kentucky, 2005)
 Leonard Maltin, Of Mice and Magic: A History of American Animated Cartoons (Penguin Books, 1987)

Notes

External links
 Fleischer Sound Cartoons Filmography

Film series introduced in 1929
Animated film series
1920s American animated films
1930s American animated films
Fleischer Studios series and characters
Television series by U.M. & M. TV Corporation
American black-and-white films
American animation anthology series